Park Hyung-Guen (born December 14, 1985) is a South Korean football player who since 2008 has played for Incheon United.

References

1985 births
Living people
South Korean footballers
Incheon United FC players
Association football midfielders